A no-frills or no frills service or product is one for which the non-essential features have been removed to keep the price low. The term "frills" originally refers to a style of fabric decoration. Something offered to customers for no additional charge may be designated as a "frill" – for example, free drinks on airline journeys, or a radio installed in a rental car. No-frills businesses operate on the principle that by removing luxurious additions, customers may be offered lower prices.

Common products and services for which no-frills brands exist include budget airlines, supermarkets, vacations and used vehicles.

No-frills supermarkets

No-frills supermarkets are recognisable by their store design and business model.
They do not decorate aisles and sometimes do not even restock shelves with foods. In this case, pallets of the products on offer are simply parked alongside the aisles, and customers picking up products will gradually empty them. When all items on a pallet have been sold, they are replaced. Prices are given on plain labels.
Queueing at the checkout is relatively common, as staffing levels reflect average demand rather than peak demand. At actual peak times, customers often have to wait.
Shopping bags are charged for, as they are seen as a frill. Thus many shoppers bring reusable shopping bags, buy shopping bags at a low fee, put their shopping in the cardboard boxes that the products originally came in, or put it directly in their shopping cart; customers must bag their own purchases. 
They somewhat employ the Pareto principle when choosing which goods to offer, meaning that in most supermarkets, 20% of products on sale account for 80% of what customers buy. Therefore, they only stock the most commonly sold products.
They only take cash and debit cards (although this has changed in many chains over the years due to increasingly prevalence and usage of credit cards).
They only open at peak times, e.g., 9 a.m. to 6 p.m. Monday to Saturday, although some stores are open 24 hours.
They often do not sell branded items, except in the case of special purchases, which are almost always at a discounted price. Instead, they sell generic or private label products.
Products are sold in one size, which is usually the best selling size of that product, rather than multiple different sizes of the product.
The shopping carts have a coin-operated slot, to ensure that the trolleys are kept on site.
They usually lack a butcher shop, bakery or deli counters, thus  meat, and cold meats are sold precut in chilled vacuum packs.
Unlike regular supermarkets which have separate teams of staff for the shop floor, the back warehouse, doing the cleaning and dealing with the clerical work, no frills supermarkets instead have a single multi-tasking team of workers dealing with all aspects of supermarket work.
No in-store background music, although some use satellite radio.

Examples of no-frills supermarket chains include:

*Dia, Minipreço and Ed are all part of the Dia Group, which is in turn part of the Carrefour Group. (Brazil, Spain)

Pathmark's No Frills

American supermarket chain Pathmark used "No Frills" as a house brand.

No-frills automobiles

In the United States, a no-frills automobile model typically has a minimum of convenience equipment, a less powerful engine and spartan trim.

Frequently, these models represent the lowest-priced version of a larger selection of more lavishly equipped and trimmed models of that same car. Often, the less-expensive models are sold with a manual transmission and have a shorter options list. Early 1950s American examples include the Chevrolet 150 and Kaiser-Frazer Henry J. These were larger cars than those produced in the US in the 1940s gasoline rationing period by Crosley, who shut down in 1952.

One of the more famous no-frills cars was the Studebaker Scotsman, which was on sale from 1957 to 1958. These cars came with a low-grade cloth-trimmed front seat and contained only a driver's side sun visor, minimal soundproofing, no door armrests and painted trim (in lieu of chrome trim); even routine convenience items, such as a cigarette lighter and dome light were deleted. Buyers were allowed to buy only a low-cost heater and a few other trim and convenience items from a short options list; a radio was not offered as an option on this model (unlike Studebaker's more expensive models).

During the 1960s and early 1970s, American automakers offered several trim levels of full-sized models (each having a different name), with a price-leading no-frills versions. Examples included the Chevrolet Biscayne, Ford Custom 500, and Plymouth Fury I. While ostensibly targeted toward fleet buyers and business customers where luxury is not a concern, these cars were also available to private customers. While many of these cars were typically sold with the standard six-cylinder or basic V-8 engine with the standard three-speed manual transmission, many of these price-leading models were also available with the full range of engines and transmissions, including those that were performance-oriented, unlike the later no-frills models that had restricted performance options. Additionally, marketing brochures typically extolled the virtues of these economy models, pointing out such features as durable and easy-to-care for upholstery with wide color availability, beauty in styling despite minimal exterior trim adornment, and features shared with more luxurious models such as suspension and ride quality, engine and transmission availability, and standard safety and convenience features—all available even for budget-conscious buyers.

By the late 1960s, a vast majority of all price-leading models were built and sold with V-8 engines and automatic transmission, as consumer needs were changing, and were even being built and sold with luxury comfort and convenience features once seen only on the higher-priced model lines, including air conditioning and power steering. Only a small handful of base model vehicles were sold with the basic six-cylinder/three-speed manual transmission power team and stripped of all options by this time, and by the early 1970s, Plymouth, Ford and Chevrolet had switched to all V-8 engine/automatic transmission power teams for the full-sized model lines. With customers turning more to volume models that were better trimmed, upholstered and equipped (even with price a primary consideration), the Big Three dropped their Spartan-trimmed price-leading models, such as the Chevrolet Biscayne and Ford Custom, or relegated them completely to fleet sales with no private buyer availability.

During the gasoline crisis of the 1970s, many American automakers began offering no-frills models on their compact lines of cars (such as the Ford Pinto MPG, and Plymouth Duster "Feather Duster"). As before, these models usually had spartan trim (vinyl seats with rubber floor covering); fewer convenience items than the more expensive models (e.g., no cigarette lighter); lighter-weight components (such as aluminum on various engine, body and suspension components); and a manual transmission.

Most no-frills cars are sold to fleet buyers, such as taxi companies or police departments. However, these models are generally available to cost-conscious private customers whose primary concerns were price, fuel economy and basic low-cost transportation.

The concept of a no-frills car in the European market was common in the 1950s with cars such as the Ford Abeille or the Citroën ID Normale. The Dacia Logan is an example of a recent no-frills car in Europe. Another example is Fiat Albea.

In Argentina and Brazil, the no-frills category takes a considerable share of the new car market. Examples of cost cuts in base versions include:

 very little or no soundproofing
 low quality plastics
 substitution of rubber on the dashboard to cheaper (rough) plastic
 spring-based instead of acceleration-based seatbelt retraction mechanisms
 no seatbelt height adjustment
 no anti-lock braking systems or airbags, except where required by law
 no seat height adjustment
 no steering wheel adjustments
 cheaper paint processes
 facelifted models instead of new generations such as Volkswagen Santana, Fiat Palio, Fiat Uno, Volkswagen Kombi, Volkswagen Citi Golf, Chevrolet Corsa
 cast iron cylinder heads and engine blocks
 no lambda sensor
 retrofitting old generation components (older, less efficient engines, platforms, dashboard components) on a European designed vehicle: Ford Fiesta, Fiat Idea, Fiat Punto, Vauxhall Meriva, Volkswagen Polo
 no lamps on the lateral direction lights or remotion of the lateral direction lights at all (meaningless)
 single-piece plastic bumpers; any grills are designed by placing indentations on the plastic
 low-quality springs on the suspension, compensated by a taller and harder adjustment
 less maintenance on the tools used to build the vehicles
 smaller and more restrictive catalytic converters

In some markets, often in the developing world, very aggressive forms of no-frills cars may be available. For example, the supermini and city cars sold at the Mercosur markets, such as the Chevrolet Celta, Chevrolet Corsa, Fiat Uno, Fiat Palio, Ford Ka and Volkswagen Gol tend to be noisy and feature cost cuttings like:

No-frills airlines

No-frills airlines are airlines that offer low fares but eliminate all non-essential services, such as complimentary food, in-flight entertainment systems, and business-class seating. A no-frills airline will typically cut overhead by flying from more remote airports (with lower access charges) and by using a single type of aircraft. Aircraft cabin interiors may be fitted out with minimum comforts, dispensing with luxuries such as seat-back video screens, reclining seats and blinds; some airlines choose to carry advertising inside the cabin to increase revenue. Should meals be served, they must be paid for in full.

Some airlines also extend the definition of "frills" to include standard services and conveniences; for example, a no-frills airline may charge passengers an additional fee for check-in luggage, using airport check-in desks, or even providing wheelchairs.

No frills rail services 
Based on the no-frills airline model, the recent liberalisation of rail licensing in Europe has brought about a no-frills budget rail travel industry. Examples include; 

 Ouigo (France) - Operated by SNCF
 Ouigo Spain - Operated by SNCF
 Avlo (Spain) - Operated by Renfe
 Lumo (UK) - Operated by FirstGroup
 Izy (France / Benelux) - Offered by Thalys
 FlixTrain (Germany / Sweden) - Open access operator

No frills hotels

Another example of a type of no frills service is lodgings. In more extreme circumstances, the line between a hotel and a hostel is blurred due to the removal of amenities. Notable no-frills chains include Motel 6, Econo Lodge, Tune Hotels, Ibis Budget, HotelF1, easyHotel and Zip by Premier Inn.

Features of no-frills hotels rooms are that themselves are smaller and more spartan in trim.  Examples and cases included with Zip rooms are twice as small (8.5 m2) as standard Premier Inn rooms. (20 m2), beds in Econo Lodge are put on boxes, so to make cleaning easier and with many Ibis Budget hotels, the reception is only opened at limited hours. Most  no frills hotels don't have door keys, instead they use either inexpensive swipe-keys or digital door locks. Many of them have no pictures on the walls, baths in the bathrooms or excessive furniture like minibars, fridges or dressing tables. Bedding is limited to pillows and duvets. Some like Tune and easyHotel even go as far as putting advertisements on the walls and in case of Zip some rooms even having no windows, instead having a sunlight-powered light box.

Like no frills airlines which charge people for seat reservations and food, no frills hotels themselves charge extra for any superfluous extras like non-basic TV channels, breakfasts; which themselves  are just limited to a continental style, tea-and-coffee making facilities, Wi-Fi internet, daily maid service; normally cleaning the room is only done when the guest leaves, and toiletries and supplement towels.

The Finnish hotel chain Omenahotelli lacks reception. Room bookings are handled online only. Instead of a physical key, hotel customers receive a digital door code. Omenahotelli guests usually spend their entire hotel stay without meeting any hotel employees.

No-frills holiday
No-frills holidays are holidays which, like no-frills airlines, do not include unnecessary services such as:

 in-flight meals
 travel representatives
 transfers between the airport and the hotel
 entertainment
 luxury accommodation

Such holidays usually have a simple fare scheme, in which fares typically increase during peak seasons, and also as more people sign up for the holiday. This rewards early reservations, and is known as "yield management".

Examples of no-frills holiday companies are:

 Just, part of the Thomson/TUI group
 Qbic, low-cost design hotels

No-frills gyms

Compared to regular fitness gyms, there has been a growing number of no frills gyms. No frills gyms are significantly different from regular gyms in the amenities offered. The ways in which these differ are:

 No reception: everything like registration and booking classes is done online.
 No fitness classes, or fitness classes are available at a supplementary cost on top of regular monthly membership fees. 
 No swimming pool, hot tub, sauna, solarium or beauty spa, due to the cost of running such facilities, e.g., needing to have a staff member there at all times and frequent cleaning.
 No café or relaxation room, drinks and snacks are available through vending machines. 
 Most of the fitness machines are self-powered, rather than electrically powered thus cutting down of power costs and running costs.

Examples of no frills gyms are easyGym, Fit4less and PureGym in the UK, Basic-Fit in Benelux and France, and McFit in Germany.

No frills filling stations

In the Netherlands and other European countries, a no frills filling station refers to unattended filling stations consisting solely of self-service pumps that only support pay at the pump. They do not include any other facilities on-site, and service is provided via a phone line. If there is a problem, drivers are to call a hotline using an on-site telephone where the station owners will be alerted to the site.

Notable chains includes Dutch chains Tango, Q8 Easy, TinQ, Firezone, Esso Express & Shell Express, and the Austrian chain Diskont.

No frills gaming systems
A few Nintendo gaming systems have model revisions that strip out non-essential features, such as the Wii's Wii Mini and the Game Boy Advance's Game Boy Micro.

Other no-frills companies
Other examples of no-frills companies include: cinemas (easyCinema), bus companies (easyBus, Magic Bus (Stagecoach), Eastern), food ranges (Tesco Value, Walmart/Asda SmartPrice), mobile phone companies (easyMobile, Telmore), and marketing (low-cost marketing).

References

External links
No Frills: The Truth Behind the Low-Cost Revolution in the Skies by Simon Calder, 2003 
 America's Cheap Sleeps: No-Frills, Budget Accommodations for $40 Or Less Per Night by Tracy Whitcombe, 1998 

 
Simple living